Wagon Train is a 1940 American Western film directed by Edward Killy and starring Tim Holt. It was this film that really started Holt's series of B Westerns for RKO, replacing those made by George O'Brien.

Plot summary 
Pecos businessman Matt Gardner is buying up freighters, or wagon trains of food supplies, at cheap prices through intimidation, and charging high prices by deliberately causing phony food shortages at his trading posts. The only one refusing to sell his supplies is Zack Sibley, who is dead set on maintaining his freighter business as well as tracking down his father's murderer, his ex-business partner. Gardner plans on eliminating any competition Sibley presents by sending his thugs to kill him and raid his wagon train.

Cast 
 Tim Holt as Zack Sibley
 Ray Whitley as Ned
 Emmett Lynn as Whopper
 Martha O'Driscoll as Helen Lee
 Malcolm 'Bud' McTaggart as Coe Gardner
 Cliff Clark as Carl Anderson, alias Matt Gardner
 Ellen Lowe as Amanthy (Whopper's Lady Friendl)
 Wade Crosby as Wagonmaster O'Follard
 Ethan Laidlaw as Henchman Pat Hays
 Monte Montague as Henchman Kurt
 Carl Stockdale as Mr. Wilkes (Gardner's Lawyer)
 Bruce Dane as McKenzie
 Glenn Strange as Stagecoach Driver

Production
The film was the first in a series of six Westerns RKO planned with Holt. Martha O'Driscoll was signed to appear in the first two.

The films proved so popular the series continued until the early 1950s.

O'Driscoll and Holt were meant to reteam in Sir Piegan Passes but it was not made.

It was filmed in Kanab, Utah and in Wildwood Regional Park in Thousand Oaks, California.

Soundtrack 
 Ray Whitley – "Wagon Train" (Written by Ray Whitley and Fred Rose)
 Ray Whitley and Glenn Strange – "Why Shore" (Written by Ray Whitley and Fred Rose)
 "A Girl Just Like You" (Written by Ray Whitley and Fred Rose)
 "Farewell" (Written by Ray Whitley and Fred Rose)

References

External links 
 
 

1940 films
1940 Western (genre) films
American Western (genre) films
American black-and-white films
Films directed by Edward Killy
Films produced by Bert Gilroy
Films scored by Paul Sawtell
RKO Pictures films
Transport films
1940s English-language films
1940s American films